Business trust may refer to:
 Trust (business), an American English term for a large business with significant market power
 Massachusetts business trust
 Business Trust in India